The 2013–14 BBL season was the 27th campaign of the British Basketball League since the league's establishment in 1987. The season featured 12 teams from across England and Scotland, including new entrant Birmingham Knights. East London Royals and Essex Leopards were both due to become the 13th and 14th League members respectively, but after deferring their original entries from the 2012–13 season for a season, both franchises withdrew their applications to join the BBL due to financial constraints.

On 12 July it was officially announced that the Mersey Tigers franchise had been withdrawn from the up-coming season by the League due to financial trouble that had plagued the club throughout the previous season, which resulted in the Tigers becoming the first club to complete an entire season without a single victory.

The season started on 27 September 2013 and ended on 11 May 2014 with the Play-off Final at Wembley Arena. Newcastle Eagles claimed a record 6th regular season title but were defeated in the Play-off Final by a dominant Worcester Wolves team who were also victorious in the BBL Trophy, beating Glasgow Rocks on their home court in the Final. Leicester Riders were crowned as the BBL Cup winners, defeating Newcastle in the Final at the National Indoor Arena.

Teams

Notable occurrences
New entrant Birmingham Knights joined as the League's 13th franchise whilst East London Royals and Essex Leopards who were both due to become the 14th and 15th League members respectively, withdrew their applications to join the BBL due to financial constraints.
Ed Percival was announced as the BBL's new chairman on 27 June 2013, replacing the outgoing Paul Blake who stepped down after nearly a decade in the position.
On 12 July it was officially announced that the Mersey Tigers franchise had been withdrawn from the up-coming season by the League due to financial trouble that had plagued the club throughout the previous season, bringing the number of teams back down to 12.
Following the sale of Surrey Heat to a partnership group consisting of Surrey Sports Park and London United, the franchise was subsequently rebranded as Surrey United prior to the start of the season. Due to the takeover, long-time head coach Creon Raftopolous was sacked and replaced by Jack Majewski.
Durham Wildcats announced on 13 August that head coach Dave Elderkin had stepped down from the role after 8 years in charge. He was replaced by former Great Britain Women's Under-20 coach Lee Davie.
On 7 September – just weeks before the start of the new season – Plymouth Raiders announced that head coach Gavin Love had been sacked following a 'vote of no confidence' from the club's board of directors. Former Raiders player Jay Marriott was appointed as his successor.
The BBL announced a new television broadcasting deal with British Eurosport on 23 September, to complement the recently launched online BBL TV platform.
A sell-out crowd saw Worcester Wolves win their first competitive game at their new venue, the Worcester Arena on 4 October, as the home side defeated reigning champions Leicester Riders 73–61.
Worcester's 62–69 victory away to Leicester Riders on 16 November, put an end to Leicester's 34-game unbeaten home winning streak, which spanned over three seasons.
Controversy surrounded Surrey head coach Jack Majewski and his decision to play star player Brandon McGill in a defeat to Cheshire Phoenix on 8 December, two days after the player suffered concussion following a clash with Darius Defoe in a game against Newcastle Eagles.
On 12 January 2014, Leicester retained the BBL Cup after beating Newcastle Eagles in the Final at the National Indoor Arena for the second year running.
Bristol Flyers became only the second-ever lower division team to beat BBL opposition and advance to the Quarter-finals of the BBL Trophy, following their 91–75 defeat of Surrey United on 16 January.
Worcester Wolves claimed their first-ever BBL title with an 83–76 victory over Glasgow Rocks in the BBL Trophy Final on 30 March, in front of 5,000 people on Glasgow's home court, the Emirates Arena.
London Lions' Joe Ikhinmwin won the annual BBL Slam Dunk Contest at Emirates Arena on 30 March.
Leicester head coach Rob Paternostro and Sheffield Sharks head coach Atiba Lyons both reached a landmark 250th game at the helm of their respective clubs on the weekend of 5/6 April.
The first ever competitive BBL game to be staged in Wales took place on 9 April between Cheshire Phoenix and Glasgow Rocks. The game was switched from Cheshire's usual home venue, the Northgate Arena, to the Deeside Leisure Centre in Queensferry, Flintshire due to availability issues. The "home" team lost 77–90 to the visiting Glasgow Rocks.
Newcastle Eagles were crowned League Champions for a record sixth time following a 106–58 win away to Surrey, on 13 April.
Durham Wildcats and the new Manchester Giants franchise (relaunched in 2012) both secured Play-off berths for the first time in their respective club history's following the conclusion of the regular season.
Worcester Wolves claimed their second piece of silverware for the season by beating Newcastle in the Championship Play-off Final on 12 May, with a 90–78 victory at Wembley Arena. Wolves' Zaire Taylor was named as the game's Most Valuable Player.

BBL Championship (Tier 1)

Final standings

The play-offs

Quarter-finals
(1) Newcastle Eagles vs. (8) Durham Wildcats

(2) Sheffield Sharks vs. (7) Manchester Giants

(3) Worcester Wolves vs. (6) London Lions

(4) Leicester Riders vs. (5) Cheshire Phoenix

Semi-finals
(1) Newcastle Eagles vs. (4) Leicester Riders

(2) Sheffield Sharks vs. (3) Worcester Wolves

Final

EBL National League Division 1 (Tier 2)

Final standings

EBL National League Division 2 (Tier 3)

Final standings

BBL Cup
The winners of the four 1st Round matches were joined by Glasgow Rocks, Leicester Riders, Newcastle Eagles and Surrey United in the Quarter-finals, who received byes for finishing in the top four BBL Championship positions last season. The Final was played on 12 January 2014 at the National Indoor Arena in Birmingham.

1st round

Quarter-finals

Semi-finals
Plymouth Raiders vs. Leicester Riders

Sheffield Sharks vs. Newcastle Eagles

Final

BBL Trophy
The 12 BBL clubs were joined by Bristol Flyers, Essex Leopards, Leeds Carnegie and Reading Rockets of the English Basketball League to form a straight knock-out competition. The first two rounds featured one-off games whilst the Semi-finals took place over two legs. The Final was held at the Emirates Arena in Glasgow for the second consecutive year and saw Worcester Wolves win their first silverware since joining the BBL in 2006.

1st round

Quarter-finals

Semi-finals
Sheffield Sharks vs. Worcester Wolves

Cheshire Phoenix vs. Glasgow Rocks

Final

Statistics leaders

Monthly awards

Seasonal awards

Molten Most Valuable Player: Zaire Taylor (Worcester Wolves)
Molten Coach of the Year: Fabulous Flournoy (Newcastle Eagles)
Molten Team of the Year:
Zaire Taylor (Worcester Wolves)
Will Creekmore (Worcester Wolves)
Victor Moses (Cheshire Phoenix)
Reggie Middleton (Cheshire Phoenix)
Malik Cooke (Newcastle Eagles)
Molten Defensive Team of the Year:
Zaire Taylor (Worcester Wolves)
Andrew Sullivan (Leicester Riders)
Daniel Northern (Glasgow Rocks)
Mike Allison (Durham Wildcats)
Fabulous Flournoy (Newcastle Eagles)
Paul Gause (Newcastle Eagles)
Molten British Team of the Year:
David Aliu (Manchester Giants)
Robert Marsden (Manchester Giants)
James Jones (Manchester Giants)
Andrew Sullivan (Leicester Riders)
Darius Defoe (Newcastle Eagles)
Nick George (Plymouth Raiders)

For the British Team of the Year and Defensive Team of the Year, six players were announced instead of the usual five due to a deadlock in votes cast by the BBL head coaches.

References

British Basketball League seasons
1
British